Nikita Igorevich Zaitsev (born 29 October 1991) is a Russian professional ice hockey defenceman currently playing for the Chicago Blackhawks in the National Hockey League (NHL).

Playing career

KHL
Zaitsev was selected by Sibir Novosibirsk of the Kontinental Hockey League (KHL) in the first round, fourth overall, of the 2009 KHL Junior Draft, making his debut for the club a few months later. After four years with the Sibir organization, Zaitsev joined his hometown CSKA Moscow, after which he began to attract international attention. He was twice a KHL All-Star (2015, 2016) and named once to the KHL First All-Star team (2014–15).

In the summer of 2015, the NHL's Toronto Maple Leafs began to garner publicized interest in Zaitsev; Zaitsev had even toured the city and arena, while also meeting with team staff, coming away "very impressed". Despite this, Zaitsev returned to Russia to honour the final year of his contract with CSKA. During the subsequent season's playoffs, he led all defencemen in scoring with 13 points (tied with Sami Lepistö and Chris Lee), while helping the top-seeded CSKA to the Gagarin Cup finals, where the team lost in the deciding Game 7 to Metallurg Magnitogorsk.

NHL

Toronto Maple Leafs
On 2 May 2016, Zaitsev signed a one-year, entry-level contract with the Maple Leafs. He made his pre-season debut with the club on 2 October, scoring a goal in a 3–2 win over the rival Montreal Canadiens. On 12 October 2016, Zaitsev made his official NHL debut in a 5–4 loss to the Ottawa Senators in the 2016–17 season opener, and was singled out for his good play by coach Mike Babcock. He scored his first NHL goal on 17 December 2016 against the Pittsburgh Penguins. By the end of the season, Zaitsev had accumulated 36 points, second most on the team and had earned a top-four spot among Toronto's defencemen, playing on the penalty kill and power play units. In the playoffs, Zaitsev missed the first two games and upon his return, was tasked with shutting down Alexander Ovechkin's line in the Maple Leafs' series with the Washington Capitals. The Capitals went on to beat the Maple Leafs in six games.

On 2 May 2017, Zaitsev signed a new seven-year, $31.5 million contract with Toronto carrying an average annual value of $4.5 million. This was based on his play from the previous season where he was one of the minutes played leaders among Maple Leafs' defencemen. During the 2017–18 season, Zaitsev was placed on injured reserve (IR) with a lower body injury on 17 December 2017. He had 7 points in 18 games with Toronto before being placed on IR. After missing 17 games, he returned to the lineup on 30 January 2018 for a game against the New York Islanders. Though used heavily by the Maple Leafs his play was not as good as in his first season and he only amassed 13 points in 60 games. He finished the 2018–19 season with 14 points in 81 games and faced criticism for his play during the playoffs in which he lead the Maple Leafs in turnovers with 11. That offseason Zaitsev reportedly requested a trade out of Toronto.

Ottawa Senators
On 1 July 2019, Zaitsev was traded (along with Connor Brown and Michael Carcone) to the Ottawa Senators in exchange for Cody Ceci, Ben Harpur, Aaron Luchuk and a third-round pick in the 2020 NHL Entry Draft. In his first season with the Senators, Zaitsev was paired with Thomas Chabot on the team's top defence pairing and was named one of the team's alternate captains. The Senators head coach, D. J. Smith, played Zaitsev as a defensive defenceman, playing against the opposing team's top players. Zaitsev struggled through the following pandemic-shortened 2021–22 season, being paired with multiple partners in an effort to find some chemistry. He was among the players that missed time after being placed on the COVID protocol list in November. In December Zaitsev was injured in a game versus the Tampa Bay Lightning, forcing him to miss four weeks. 

Senators general manager Pierre Dorion attempted to trade Zaitsev during the 2022 offseason but could find no partners. His play to begin the 2022–23 season was "tumultuous" and he was placed on waivers on 9 November 2022. Zaitsev cleared waivers on 10 November and was demoted to the Senators' American Hockey League (AHL) affiliate, the Belleville Senators, on 18 November. He played in three games in the AHL before being recalled on 1 December.

Chicago Blackhawks
On 22 February 2023, Zaitsev was traded with a second-round pick in 2023 and a fourth-round pick in 2026 to the Chicago Blackhawks for future considerations.

Career statistics

Regular season and playoffs

International

Awards and honours

References

External links 
 

1991 births
Living people
Belleville Senators players
Chicago Blackhawks players
HC CSKA Moscow players
Expatriate ice hockey players in Canada
Ottawa Senators players
Russian ice hockey defencemen
Russian expatriate ice hockey people
Russian expatriate sportspeople in Canada
HC Sibir Novosibirsk players
Sibirskie Snaipery players
Ice hockey people from Moscow
Toronto Maple Leafs players
Undrafted National Hockey League players
Zauralie Kurgan players